Ursulina de Jesus (died 1754), was an alleged Brazilian witch.

She was married to Sebastiano de Jesus in São Paulo. Her husband had a position of some importance in the city. She was accused of witchcraft by her husband, who claimed that she had prevented him from having children by making him sterile with the use of magic. At the time, he was having an affair, and his mistress, Cesaria, also confirmed his testimony in court.

Ursulina de Jesus was sentenced guilty of heresy by having used witchcraft. She was executed by burning in public.

References
 Luiz Henrique Lima. Professor Roxanne Rimstead. ANG 553 – Women Writers. 2 April 2009. Lima 1. The Witches in Brazil

People executed for witchcraft
People executed by Portugal by burning
People executed by Colonial Brazil
1754 deaths
Year of birth unknown
18th-century Brazilian people
18th-century Brazilian women
18th-century executions by Portugal